The Marksville Commercial Historic District is a  historic district in Marksville, Louisiana including a total of 48 contributing properties built between  and 1933.  It was listed on the National Register of Historic Places in 1983.

It includes Beaux Arts and Federal architecture.

Selected properties are:
Avoyelles Parish Courthouse (1927), a four-story Classical Revival brick courthouse
Laborde Barber Shop-Old Masonic Hall (c.1890), one-story brick gable-fronted building with gable end returns
Wade Couvillion Law Office (c.1920), one-story frame, gable-fronted, galleried building
Old Voinche Building (c.1850), a two-story brick commercial building, remodeled in c. 1890, with an Art Deco front added c.1940.  Brick cornice from 1850 survives on side.  Court was held on its second floor during construction of 1927 courthouse. Comparison of 1981 photo vs. 2016 photo above shows that two-story gallery of Old Voinche Building (farthest to left in photo) has been added since 1981 (or it was restored after being lost before 1981).
Old Piazza Store (c. 1930), "one-story brick commercial building with raised parapeted front"
Old Wilson Building (c.1925), "one-story brick commercial building with raised parapeted front"
W.W. Voinche Building (c.1925), "one-story brick commercial with shaped gable parapet"
Deshautlelle Building (c.1925), "two-story brick commercial building with paneled brickwork in parapet"

The district is roughly bounded by Monroe St., Washington St., N. Ogden St., and Bontempt St. in Marksville.

References

Historic districts on the National Register of Historic Places in Louisiana
National Register of Historic Places in Avoyelles Parish, Louisiana
Buildings and structures completed in 1890
Courthouses in Louisiana